The Centre for Research on the Epidemiology of Disasters (CRED) is a research unit of the University of Louvain (UCLouvain). It is part of the School of Public Health located on the UCLouvain Brussels Woluwe campus, in Brussels, Belgium.

CRED has been active for over thirty years in the fields of international disaster and conflict health studies, with research and training activities linking relief, rehabilitation and development. It promotes research, training and technical expertise on humanitarian emergencies, with a special focus on public health and epidemiology.

History
In 1971, Professor , an epidemiologist at UCLouvain, initiated a research programme to study health issues in disaster situations. Two years later he established CRED as a non-profit institution with international status. Since 1980, CRED has been a World Health Organization (WHO) Collaborating Centre.

Following the retirement of Professor Lechat in 1992, Professor Debarati Guha-Sapir—a researcher in the programme since 1984—became CRED's director.

Goals
CRED promotes research and provides an evidence base to the international community on the burden of disease and related health issues arising from disasters and conflicts to improve preparedness and responses to humanitarian emergencies.

CRED trains field managers, students, relief personnel and health professionals in the management of short- and long-term humanitarian emergencies.

Focus
CRED's research focuses on humanitarian and emergency situations with major impacts on human health. These include all types of natural disasters such as earthquakes, floods, windstorms, famines and droughts; and human induced disasters creating mass displacement of people from civil strife and conflicts.		
   
CRED focuses on health aspects and the burden of disease arising from disasters and complex emergencies. CRED also promotes research on the broader aspects of humanitarian crises, such as human rights and humanitarian law, socio-economic and environmental issues, early warning systems, mental health care, and the special needs of women and children.

CRED is actively involved in stimulating debates on the effectiveness of various humanitarian interventions. It encourages scientific and policy discussions on existing and potential interventions and their impacts on acute and chronic malnutrition, human survival, morbidity, infectious diseases, and mental health.

The CRED team works in four main areas:
 Natural disasters & their impacts
 Conflict & health research
 Database & information support
 Capacity building & training

The team
CRED's multinational and multidisciplinary team includes experts in medicine and public health, informatics and database management, psychology, nutritional sciences, sociology, economics and geography. The working languages are English and French.

References

External links
 CRED website
 The EM-DAT International Disaster Database
 The CE-DAT Complex Emergency Database
 The MICRODIS Project - Integrated Health, Social and Economic Impact of Extreme Events: Evidence, Methods and Tools an FP6 project funded by the European Commission.

Research institutes in Belgium
Medical and health organisations based in Belgium
World Health Organization collaborating centres